Ulduz Saleh gizi Rafili-Aliyeva (15 December 1922, Ganja, Goranboy region – 2006, Baku) was an Azerbaijani and Soviet theater director, professor, Honored Art Worker of the Azerbaijan SSR (1964). She was the first Azerbaijani women to become a professional theater director.

Early life and education 
Ulduz Rafili was born on 15 December 1922 in Ganja. Her father died before she was born and her mother married for the second time. When her mother died in 1935 Rafili started living with her older sister in Moscow. 

In 1938, she graduated from Industrial College in Moscow. Later she continued studies in Moscow. Rafili entered the Institute of Railway Engineers where she studied and worked as a station attendant in the Moscow metro and as a machinist on an electric train.

Rafili returned to Baku in 1945. There she entered the faculty of directing of the present University of Culture and Arts, graduating in 1951.

Career 

In 1952, Rafili started working as a director in the Young Spectator's Theatre in Baku. During next 20 years she directed over 50 performances on the stage of the theater. Rafili became the first female theater director in Azerbaijan. Many performances staged by Rafili have won All-Union festivals and been awarded diplomas and prizes.

In 1963-1967, Rafili was elected a deputy, engaged in active socio-political activities.

In 1972-1975 Rafili worked as the chief director of the Young Spectator's Theater. In September 1975, Rafili started her pedagogical career at the Department of Opera Training of the Baku Music Academy. During her work at the Music Academy, she directed S. Rakhmaninoff's "Aleko", P. Tchaikovsky's "Iolanta", F. Amirov's "Sevil", Mozart's "The Marriage of Figaro" and others.

Ulduz Rafili died in 2006 in Baku.

Personal life 
Rafili was married to Gurban Aliyev who worked in the Ministry of Education of the Azerbaijan SSR. They had one son, Hasan Aliyev.

Awards and honors 
In 1964, Rafili  was awarded a title of Honored Art Worker of the Azerbaijan SSR.

In 2012, a memorial evening dedicated to the 90th anniversary of Rafili was held at the Young Spectator's Theatre in Baku.

Works 

 Second Family (1954)
 Separated roads (1957)
 Crane train (1958)
 Gavroche (1959) by Victor Hugo
 Song of hope (1959)
 Courage (1963)
 Shirinbala collects honey (1965) by Salam Gadirzade
 Rooster (1965)
 Rabbit's birthday (1966) by Khanymana Alibeyli
 The servant of two masters (1968) by Carlo Goldoni
 Last night of last year (1968) by Anar Rzayev
 Gypsy girl (1971) by S.Sani Akhundov
 Ayjan (1973) by Khanymana Alibeyli

References 

1922 births
2006 deaths
Women theatre directors
Azerbaijani theatre directors
Soviet theatre directors
Honored Art Workers of the Azerbaijan SSR